HMS Holcombe was a Type III  of the Royal Navy.  She was named after the Holcombe Hunt in Lancashire. She was the first and thus far only ship of the Royal Navy named HMS Holcombe.

Built on the Clyde by Alexander Stephen and Sons, she was laid down on 3 April 1941, launched on 14 April 1942 and commissioned on 16 September 1942.

Service history
Holcombe was allocated to the Mediterranean Fleet in October 1942 but only arrived at Gibraltar on 1 February 1943 after first escorting convoy WS24 to Freetown and then being retained there as a convoy escort. Once in the Mediterranean she was used on escort duties initially based at Gibraltar and subsequently at Algiers and then Malta. She was involved in escorting the invasion fleet for Operation Husky.

Loss
Whilst escorting convoy KMS34 on 12 December 1943 her sister ship  was torpedoed and sunk off Jijel, Algeria, by   commanded by Kptlt. Gerd Kelbling. The other escorts commenced to search for the submarine but U-593 managed to torpedo Holcombe during the hunt. Holcombe sank rapidly with the loss of 81 men. There were no casualties.

References

Publications
 
 English, John (1987). The Hunts: a history of the design, development and careers of the 86 destroyers of this class built for the Royal and Allied Navies during World War II. England: World Ship Society. .

 

Hunt-class destroyers of the Royal Navy
Ships built on the River Clyde
1942 ships
World War II destroyers of the United Kingdom
Ships sunk by German submarines in World War II
World War II shipwrecks in the Mediterranean Sea
Maritime incidents in December 1942